Balti Kings was a short-lived radio programme that aired from January to February 2001.  There were six half-hour episodes and it was broadcast on BBC Radio 4.  It starred Anil Desai, Anthony Zaki, Kriss Dosanjh, and Shiv Grewal.

References 
 Lavalie, John. Balti Kings. EpGuides. 21 Jul 2005. 29 Jul 2005  <Balti Kings (a Titles and Air Dates Guide)>.

BBC Radio 4 programmes
2001 radio programme debuts